Christianity is a small minority in Mauritania. All of the roughly 4,500 Catholics in Mauritania are within the country's only diocese, the Diocese of Nouakchott. There are several expatriate African churches in Mauritania, though there are no more than 200 Protestants in the country, including foreigners. 

In spite of a strict law against evangelization, the Mauritanian Christian community is growing and there estimated to be 400–1,000 ethnic Mauritanian Christians. For a period of eight months the Miracle Channel, a Norwegian/Swedish christian channel, broadcast clandestine Christian gatherings in the Mauritanian desert containing over 160 people.

Issues
The distribution of Christian literature and the evangelizing of non-Muslims are prohibited by law. Bibles are rarely printed or distributed.

References

Sources
Status of religious freedom in Mauritania article

http://parl.gc.adventist.org/documents/world_reports/WorldReport05.pdf